The 2017 ACC Championship Game was played on December 2, 2017. It was the 13th annual ACC Football Conference Championship Game to determine the 2017 champion of the Atlantic Coast Conference. The game was held at Bank of America Stadium in Charlotte, North Carolina, and featured the Clemson Tigers and the Miami Hurricanes. Clemson won the game, 38-3.

History 
The 2017 Championship Game was the 13th in the Atlantic Coast Conference's 65-year history. Last season, the ACC Championship Game featured the Clemson Tigers, champions of the Atlantic Division, and the Virginia Tech Hokies, champions of the Coastal Division. Clemson won the game 42–35, and went on to win the 2016 College Football Playoff National Championship.

Site selection 
The championship game had been hosted in Charlotte, North Carolina from 2010 to 2015, and had been slated to host through at least 2019. However, in response to North Carolina's Public Facilities Privacy & Security Act (HB2), the ACC voted in September 2016 to move the 2016 championship out of North Carolina. Camping World Stadium in Orlando, Florida was chosen as a replacement site for the 2016 game. ACC Commissioner John Swofford delayed the decision on where to hold the 2017 football Championship Game due to the ongoing controversy. On April 19, 2017, the ACC announced that the football championship game and other neutral site conference events would return to Charlotte in 2017.

Teams

#7 Miami Hurricanes 

Miami secured its spot in the game by winning the Coastal Division. This is the first ACC divisional title and first appearance in the ACC Championship Game for the Hurricanes.

#1 Clemson Tigers 

Clemson qualified for the game by winning the Atlantic Division with a 7–1 record.  Their only loss was to Syracuse, while the Tigers defeated: Louisville, Boston College, Virginia Tech, Wake Forest, Georgia Tech, NC State, and Florida State.  This is the Tiger's third straight appearance in the ACC Championship game.

Scoring summary 

Source:

Statistics

References

Championship Game
ACC Championship Game
Clemson Tigers football games
Miami Hurricanes football games
ACC Championship Game
ACC Championship Game